Sally Redman  is a New Zealand-born Australian public health researcher and chief executive officer of the Sax Institute in Sydney, where she leads the 45 and Up Study, a NSW-wide project with over 260,000 participants responding to questionnaires on healthy ageing.

Career 
Redman has a BA in psychology (1978) and PhD (1982) from Victoria University of Wellington. 

She moved to Australia and in 1984 joined the University of Newcastle as a lecturer in the Faculty of Medicine. In 1994–95 she was employed by the New South Wales Cancer Council. In 1995 she was appointed the inaugural CEO of the National Breast Cancer Centre, where she worked until becoming the inaugural CEO of the Sax Institute in 2002, where she encourages the use of  research evidence in Australia-wide health policy making.

As of 2021, she is also conjoint professor at the University of Newcastle.

Honours and recognition 
Redman was awarded the Centenary Medal in 2001 for "service to the health and welfare of Australian women diagnosed with breast cancer". She was made an Officer of the Order of Australia in the 2013 Australia Day Honours for "distinguished service to public health through leadership in the care of women with breast cancer, contributions to research and higher education and the promotion of relationships between researchers, policy makers and practitioners".

Selected publications

References 

Living people
Year of birth missing (living people)
Victoria University of Wellington alumni
Australian public health doctors
Women public health doctors
Australian medical researchers
Academic staff of the University of Newcastle (Australia)